Mates from the Murrumbidgee is a 1911 Australian silent movie. It is considered a lost film and was arguably the first Australian war film.

Plot
John, James and Mary are school friends, who grow up near the Murrumbidgee River. As they grow up both John and James fall for Mary, but Mary loves John. John and James work as drovers then join the Australian Lighthorse during the Second Boer War, both fighting for the New South Wales Lancers. While fighting with the Boers, James is seriously wounded.

Mary ends up poisoning herself and one of the friends shoots the other.

The film includes a charge at Majuba Hill (even though that took place during the First Boer War). This was done "for the sake of the picturesque".

It also included a triumphant return to Sydney. A con

Cast
Charles Villiers

Release
The film was released on a double bill with Fighting Blood, an American Western. It was accompanied by a lecturer who would explain the plot; for many screenings, this was the noted comedian Charles Woods.

The Colac Herald described the film as "a gem of its kind".

References

External links

Mates from the Murrumbidgee at AustLit

Australian black-and-white films
Australian silent feature films
Lost Australian films
Films directed by Alfred Rolfe
Australian war films
1911 war films
1911 lost films
Lost war films
Silent war films
1910s English-language films